Made in Argentina is a 1987 Argentine comedy drama film co-written and directed by Juan José Jusid and starring Luis Brandoni, Marta Bianchi, Leonor Manso, Patricio Contreras and Frank Vincent.

Synopsis 
Osvaldo and Mabel, an Argentine couple who went into exile for political reasons and have been living in the United States for a decade, travel to their home country to reunite with their family and friends, including "El Negro", who is Mabel's brother, and his wife, "La Yoli". Mabel offers her brother the possibility of working in New York with the aim of improving his economic situation, but his wife opposes it.

Cast 
 Luis Brandoni - Osvaldo
 Marta Bianchi - Mabel
 Leonor Manso - Yoli/Cuñada
 Patricio Contreras - El negro/Cuñado
 Hugo Arana
 Frank Vincent - Vito
 Mario Luciani
 Alberto Busaid - Quique
 Gabriela Flores
 Alejo García Pintos
 Jorge Rivera López
 Marzenka Novak

External links 
 
 Made in Argentina at Cine Nacional

1987 comedy films
1987 films
Argentine comedy films
1980s Spanish-language films
1980s Argentine films